Constance LaCienega, better known as Connie the Hormone Monstress, is the female hormone monster, who helps girls go through puberty in the Netflix series Big Mouth. She works as Jessi's hormone monstress and serves as a foil to Maury, with whom she has an on and off sexual relationship. She embodies the part of a female's mind that yearns for glamour and says such catchphrases as "Get rid!" and "Bubble bath" (often pronounced "bubba baff").

Connie is voiced by American actress Maya Rudolph, who has received critical acclaim for her role, winning the Primetime Emmy Award for Outstanding Character Voice-Over Performance in both 2020 and 2021 alongside a further nomination in 2022.

Appearance
Connie is a vibrant yellow hormone monster with long, flowing, and luscious hair and tawny brown body with fur that covers her chest, arms, legs and bottom. She has two horns on her head and large ears on the sides. Her eyes are various shades of blue. She has a large nose with massive pronounced nostrils that sit above her broad mouth. Connie's hands are scrawny, pale and yellow and she has hooves for feet.

Character

Romantic life
Connie has a long sexual past with Maury that dates back nearly as far as time. They have an on and off relationship that swings from sexual partners to bitter enemies. In the first season finale of Human Resources, Maury becomes pregnant with Connie's child, but Connie does not want the baby. Because of this, Maury officially breaks up with her.

Career
In "Everybody Bleeds", Connie showed up in Jessi's house after she got her first period to tell her that she had officially begun menstruating. Connie told her about all of the wonderful, horrible, and in-between things she'd be experiencing during puberty. Although Jessi was frightened by Connie's threatening demeanor, she took the time to tell her that she looked pretty.

In "Am I Gay?", Connie showed up to tell Jessi that her date with her new boyfriend, Nick, was going horribly and that she should dump him. Jessi told Nick they should just be friends and Nick agreed. However, Nick went on to tell everyone at school that it was he who dumped her, which angered Connie, causing Jessi to curse Nick out in front of the entire school.

In "Sleepover: A Harrowing Ordeal of Emotional Brutality", Connie admired the popular girls, Devin and Lola, and convinced Jessi to be friends with them even though Jessi hated them for being bullies. Connie's bad influence on Jessi led to her becoming a bully herself and making fun of her friend, Missy.

In "Girls Are Horny Too", Connie took Jessi to go to the mall to buy a bra and later used Jessi's hand mirror to introduce Jessi to her talking vagina.

In "The Head Push", Connie was revealed to be Missy's hormone monstress also, and led her into playing seven minutes in heaven with Andrew at Leah's party. Because Connie's client was working with Maury's client, the two had an awkward reunion. Connie said that her client had no experience and no idea what she was doing, nor did Maury's client Andrew. During Andrew and Missy's making out session, Connie and Maury put their past behind them.

In ""Dark Side of the Boob", Connie was revealed to be Gina's hormone monstress. She helped Jessi and Missy start to love their bodies with the song, "I Love My Body".

At the end of "The Department of Puberty", Connie became Nick's hormone monstress. Nick was confused as to why he had a female hormone monster but Connie told him not to question it and taught him how to masturbate.

In "My Furry Valentine", Connie started making Nick go through female puberty.

In "Girls Are Angry Too", Jessi and Nick got into a fight over the school's dress code and Connie, being the hormone monster for both of them, played both sides of the argument until they eventually made up.

In "A Very Special 9/11 Episode", Nick was mad at Connie for siding with Jessi when she was in a toxic relationship with Michaelangelo. Connie failed to warn Jessi about these red flags because she, too, was blinded by his looks and couldn't see what a horrible man he truly was. In the end, Connie decided to retire as Nick's hormone monstress.

In other media
Connie appeared in The Big Mouth Valentine's Day Special, appearing on February 8, 2019.

Connie appears in a spin-off in the Netflix animated Big Mouth series: Human Resources, she is joined by Maury the Hormone Monster.

References

Television characters introduced in 2017
Characters in animated television series
Comedy television characters
Female characters in animated series
Fictional bisexual females
Fictional characters from New York City
Fictional monsters
Fictional sex workers
Big Mouth (TV series) characters